Penelope (Penny) Endersby  is a British researcher and academic specialising in armour and explosives. She was appointed chief executive of the Met Office in December 2018. Prior to that, she led cyber and information systems at the Defence Science and Technology Laboratory.

Education and early career 
Endersby grew up in north London and was educated at Haberdashers' Aske's School for Girls, Elstree. She studied Natural Sciences at the University of Cambridge, and was a member of Newnham College. She remains an associate of Newnham. Here she became interested in materials science and metallurgy. She was sponsored by British Gas, researching fuel cells. After graduating she joined the Royal Armament and Research Development Establishment in 1993.

Research 
Endersby, a researcher specialising in armour and explosives, served at the Royal Armament and Research Development Establishment, becoming the "UK expert on electric and intelligent armours". She was appointed as the department manager at the Defence Science and Technology Laboratory in 2009. She began to focus on C4ISR and cyber security. She holds a Royal Academy of Engineering visiting professorship at the University of Southampton. Endersby was made division head of Cyber and Information Systems Division at the Defence Science and Technology Laboratory in 2015. She was involved in their International Women's Day celebrations.

She joined the council of the Institute of Physics in 2017. Endersby was appointed as chief executive at the Met Office in December 2018; she is the first woman to fill that role. She serves on the board of Ploughshare Innovations, the Ministry of Defence (United Kingdom) technology transfer office.

In 2021 she was elected a Fellow of the Royal Academy of Engineering

Personal life 
Endersby is an expert choir singer. She has two children. She is interested in wildlife and records the UK phenology. She is a trustee of the Wiltshire Wildlife Trust.

References 

Year of birth missing (living people)
Living people
Alumni of Newnham College, Cambridge
Met Office
British women scientists
Computer security specialists
Fellows of the Royal Academy of Engineering
Female Fellows of the Royal Academy of Engineering
People educated at Haberdashers' Girls' School